Lothar Wolleh (January 20, 1930 – September 28, 1979) was a well-known German photographer.

Until the end of the sixties, Lothar Wolleh worked as a commercial photographer. He made portraits of international contemporary painters, sculptors and performance artists. Altogether, he photographed around 109 artists, including known personalities such as Georg Baselitz, Joseph Beuys, Dieter Roth, Jean Tinguely, René Magritte, Günther Uecker, Gerhard Richter, Edward Kienholz, Otto Piene, Niki de Saint Phalle, and Christo.

Life

 
Lothar Wolleh was born in Berlin-Wedding, the first of four sons of the unmarried worker Else Martha Wolleh. He spent the World War II years in Berlin, suffering the heavy Allied bombing campaign that finished the long struggle. The death of his uncle's family as well as his participation "in the last squad" during the final battle for Berlin in April and May 1945 left deep psychological scars. In the grim, post-war years from 1946 to 1947, he studied "concrete painting" in the elementary school class at the Hochschule für angewandte Kunst ("University of applied arts") in Berlin-Weißensee.

From December 1947 to October 1949, he lived in “Boys Town” in Bad Vilbel, in a camp run by the US Army for uprooted young Germans, based on the model of Father Edward J. Flanagan. A few months after his return to Berlin in July 1950, he was arrested by the Soviet occupying forces and sentenced by a special court "OSO" (remote judgement from Moscow) to 15 years in a forced labor camp, for alleged espionage and diversion under Articles 58.6 and 58.9 of the USSR.

For the next six years, Wolleh was confined in the GULAG labor camp Vorkutlag in the USSR, where he did forced labor in a coal mine. Wolleh was able to return to Berlin in 1956, after Konrad Adenauer's successful negotiations for the return of German prisoners of war. Torture after his arrest, and the long hard detention and working conditions in coal mining, left behind physical damage and post-traumatic disorders. However, the GULAG labor camp Vorkutlag allowed Wolleh's first contact with photography and his mythical worship of light.

After his return from exile, from 1956 to 1957 Wolleh resumed his education in the Lette-Verein, a continuation school for photography, design, and fashion in Berlin. He took part in a regular monthly recovery program of the World Council of Churches for war-damaged youth. This program made it possible for him to visit the Swedish island of Gotland in 1958, which was an inspiration for his lifelong strong affinity towards Sweden, its culture, landscape, and people.

From 1962 until his death he lived and worked in Düsseldorf as a freelance photographer. Initially, he worked primarily in advertising, but later focused on his artistic work. In 1964 he married his wife Karin. His son Oliver was born in 1965, and his daughter Anouchka in 1966. 

In 1979 Lothar Wolleh died after an asthma attack in London, shortly after he had photographed Henry Moore. His grave is on Gotland in Sweden.

Work 
As a freelancer for the advertising agency TEAM, which also included Helmut Newton, Wolleh became one of the most famous and expensive fashion, advertising, and portrait photographers in the Federal Republic of Germany during the 1960s. His clients included well-known companies such as the Deutsche Bundesbahn, Tchibo or Volkswagen. In 1965 he portrayed Chancellor Ludwig Erhard in his campaign for the general election.

In the years 1962 to 1965, Wolleh photographed the ground-breaking Second Vatican Council in Rome. With the help of Father Emil Schmitz SJ, Wolleh's first photo book Das Konzil, II Vatikanisches Konzil was published in 1965 by Belser. In 1975, he photographed the Jubilee celebration, and published the photographic folio Apostolorum Limina. This work, with its blurring, represented a radical evolution of Wolleh´s color photography, as hinted by his first book.

In 1969, Wolleh traveled for several months through the Soviet Union. The photographs taken on this journey found their way into the 1970 illustrated book USSR - The Soviet State and its People, which he published together with Heinrich Böll and  Valentin Katajew with Belser publisher.

In the late 1960s, at the request of his friend the German painter Günther Uecker, Wolleh began to systematically portray more than one hundred international well-known painters, sculptors, and Actionists. From the 1970s, Wolleh did relatively little work as a commercial photographer, devoting himself almost exclusively to his series of artist portraits, in which he initially photographed the well-known artists of the Düsseldorf scene, including Heinz Mack, Otto Piene, Joseph Beuys, and Gerhard Richter. Soon however, his project expanded beyond the borders of the Rhineland to the whole of Europe, focusing on the Zero group, and Nouveau Réalisme, with members such as Niki de Saint Phalle and Jean Tinguely.

Out of this project several comprehensive photobook-projects evolved:
1970- UdSSR (USSR)
1972- Art Scene Düsseldorf 
1972- Apostolorum Limina
1973- Das Unterwasserbuch (The Underwater Book, together with Joseph Beuys)

Several book and art portfolio projects remained unfinished, so a volume to Lucio Fontana, Jan Schoonhoven, The illustrated book "Men of Management", in which company founders and managers of the leading German companies were portrayed, was not to be released because of feared attacks by the Red Army faction. Another project was Das Unterwasserbuch, which Beuys and Wolleh had planned together; he created 51 format-filling pictures for the book. The photographs were taken during the construction of the Beuys exhibition at the Moderna Museet in Stockholm in 1971.

In his final years between 1977 and 1979, Wolleh had several stays in Poland.  At his death, the unfinished photo volumes The Black Madonna of Czestochowa and Wawel Castle were still underway. Posthumously, numerous portraits of the Polish avant-garde have emerged.[1]

Legacy
Wolleh's photograph of René Magritte and his wife is said to have inspired singer-songwriter Paul Simon to compose the ballad "Rene And Georgette Magritte With Their Dog After The War".

In his work, Lothar Wolleh pursued idiosyncratic creative principles that gave his portraits an unmistakable signature. His works are precisely designed and staged through a clear, often strictly symmetrical image structure. The portrayed persons are usually placed as a whole figure on the vertical central axis in the upper half of the picture. Often the camera is on the ground or near the ground, so that the foreground occupies almost the entire lower half of the picture, establishing a base with a clear horizon line dividing the image area. Characteristicly, he used black and white photography, in the context of a basically square format. In total, Lothar Wolleh is known to have portrayed 109 artists.

In 2007, the comprehensive retrospective Lothar Wolleh – Eine Wiederentdeckung: Fotografien 1959 bis 1979 (Lothar Wolleh - A Rediscovery: Photographs 1959 to 1979) was shown in Germany at Kunsthalle Bremen, Stadtmuseum Hofheim, Kunstmuseum Ahlen, and the Deutschherrenhaus Koblenz.

Selected exhibitions
 1962: Otto Steinert und Schüler. Fotografische Ausstellung, Gruppenausstellung in der Göppinger Galerie, Frankfurt/Main
 1964: Farbige Fotografie. Bilder aus dem Vatikan, Einzelausstellung: Schatzkammer des Essener Münsters. Die Ausstellung wurde vom Essener Bischof Hengsbach (am 21. März 1964) eröffnet
 1965: Zyklus von Farbfotos zum römischen Konzil, Einzelausstellung in der Galerie Valentin, Stuttgart
 1980: Lothar Wolleh: Künstlerbildnisse. Kunstobjekte, Photographien, Einzelausstellung der Künstlerporträts in der Städtischen Kunsthalle Düsseldorf
 1986: Lothar Wolleh - Das Foto als Kunststück" Einzelausstellung der Lippischen Gesellschaft für Kunst e.V. im Detmolder Schloß
 1995: "Lothar Wolleh 1930-1979: Künstlerbildnisse - Kunstobjekte, Photographien“  Kunstmuseum Ahlen 
 2005–2007: Lothar Wolleh. Eine Wiederentdeckung: Fotografien 1959 bis 1979, Einzelausstellung: Kunsthalle Bremen, Ludwig Museum Koblenz, Kunst-Museum Ahlen, Stadtmuseum Hofheim am Taunus
 2006: Joseph Beuys in Aktion. Heilkräfte der Kunst – Gruppenausstellung: museum kunst palast, Düsseldorf
 2008: Fotos schreiben Kunstgeschichte – Gruppenausstellung: museum kunst palast, Düsseldorf
 2008: Staatliche Museen zu Berlin, Kunstbibliothek, Unsterblich! Das Foto des Künstlers 2008: Lothar Wolleh: Künstlerportraits Galerie f5,6, München
 2009: „Lothar Wolleh: Portraits d'artistes“ Goethe-Institut Paris
 2012: "Lothar Wolleh:  Joseph Beuys im Moderna Museet, Stockholm, Januar 1971", Ausstellung im Hamburger Bahnhof Museum für Gegenwart, Berlin
 2012: “Das Kozil - Fotografien von Lothar Wolleh, Berlin” Bonifatiushaus Fulda
 2013: “Lothar Wolleh (1930 - 1979)  Das Zweite Vatikanische Konzil im Bild  Fotografien” Franz Hitze Haus, Münster
 2014: Lothar Wolleh Künstlerportraits der sechziger und siebziger Jahre, Kunstmuseum Magdeburg
 2015: Lothar Wolleh – Die ZERO–Künstler, Galerie Pavlov’s Dog, Berlin
 2015: Lothar Wolleh - Vaticanum II, Galerie f5,6, München
 2017: Lothar Wolleh - Portraits international bekannter Künstler, Galerie Ruth Leuchter, Düsseldorf
 2018: „Lothar Wolleh – Bernd Jansen Künstlerportraits“, Hermann Harry Schmitz Institut, Düsseldorf
 2019: „Lothar Wolleh Raum 1 - Menschen, Farben, Licht“, Lothar Wolleh Raum, Berlin
 2020: „Subjekt und Objekt. Foto Rhein Ruhr“, Kunsthalle Düsseldorf
 2020: „Lothar Wolleh Raum 2 - Jenseits der Gegen¬ständlichkeit“, Lothar Wolleh Raum, Berlin
 2020: „The Sky as a Studio. Yves Klein and his Contemporaries“, Centre Pompidou-Metz
 2020: „Lothar Wolleh Raum 3 - Atmosphären der Phantasie“, Lothar Wolleh Raum, Berlin
 2020: „TRUTH/REALITY“, Coppejans Gallery, Antwerpen
 2021: „Joseph Beuys. Der Raumkurator, mit Arbeiten von Lothar Wolleh, Staatsgalerie, Stuttgart
 2021: „Der Erfinder der Elektrizität. Joseph Beuys und der Christusimpuls. Mit einer Dokumentation von Lothar Wolleh, St. Matthäus-Kirche, Berlin
 2021: „"Wer nicht denken will fliegt raus.", Coppejans Gallery, Antwerpen
 2021: „Lothar Wolleh: Intuition! Interaction!“, Museum für Zeitgenössische Kunst Antwerpen (M HKA)
 2021: „Sankt Peter in Sankt Peter - Die Rombilder von Lothar Wolleh, Kunst-Station Sankt Peter, Köln
 2021: „Joseph Beuys – Lothar Wolleh: das Unterwasserbuch-Projekt“, Lothar Wolleh Raum, Berlin
 2021: „Westblick – Ostblick | Künstlerporträts von Lothar Wolleh und Lenke Szilágyi, Collegium Hungaricum, Berlin
 2021: „Kriwet – ein Dichter aus Düsseldorf, Heinrich-Heine-Institut, Düsseldorf
 2021: „NOTHINGTOSEENESS void/white/silence“, Akademie der Künste, Berlin
 2021: „Beat the System!“, Ludwig Forum Aachen
 2021: „Beuys & Duchamp Artists of the Future”, Kaiser Wilhelm Museum, Krefeld
 2021: „Lothar Wolleh: Joseph Beuys - Vom Moderna Museet zum Unterwasserbuch-Projekt“, Goethe-Institut, Stockholm
 2021: „Warum denn in die Ferne ..." oder "In 18 Büchern um die Welt", Esslinger Kunstverein e.V.
 2021: „Joseph Beuys: Antecedent, Coincidences and Influences”, Museo de Arte Contemporaneo Helga de Alvear, Cáceres
 2022: „Lothar Wolleh Raum 5 - Im Focus Günther Uecker“, Lothar Wolleh Raum, Berlin

 Public collections 
 Kunsthalle Bremen
 Kunst-Museum Ahlen
 Museum Folkwang, Essen
 Museum Kunst Palast, Düsseldorf
 Tate Gallery / National Gallery of Scotland
 Muzeum Sztuki in Łódź, Łódź

 Gallery 

 Publications 
1965: The Council: The Second Vatican Council; Chr. Belser Verlag
1970: UdSSR. Der Sowjetstaat und seine Menschen. (USSR: The Soviet State and its people); Chr. Belser Verlag
1971: Günther Uecker / Lothar Wolleh: Nagelbuch;  Verlag Galerie Der Spiegel, Cologne
1972: Lothar Wolleh: Art Scene Düsseldorf 1; Chr. Belser Verlag
1973: Das Unterwasserbuch (The Underwater Book, together with Joseph Beuys.)
1975: Lothar Wolleh: Apostolorum Limina; Arcade Verlag, Arcade Verlag
1978: Günther Uecker: Ludwig van Beethovens Leonore. Idee einer Oper; Besser Verlag
 1981: Lothar Wolleh (Photo), Günther Uecker, Guido de Werd (text): Bühnenskulpturen für Lohengrin'', Städtisches Museum Haus Koekkoek, Kleve

Notes

References

External links

Website of Lothar Wolleh
Lothar Wolleh - Galerie f 5,6

1930 births
1979 deaths
20th-century German photographers
Photographers from Berlin
Deaths from asthma